Henryk Rzętkowski (15 April 1901 – 10 January 1972) was a Polish film actor. He appeared in more than 25 films between 1924 and 1960.

Selected filmography
 Pan Tadeusz (1928)
 Księżna Łowicka (1932)
 His Excellency, The Shop Assistant (1933)
 Pieśniarz Warszawy (1934)

References

External links

1901 births
1972 deaths
Polish male film actors
Polish male silent film actors
Male actors from Warsaw
20th-century Polish male actors